San Janv or São João is an annual Catholic festival celebrated on June 24 in Goa in an unusual manner: After Mass, young Goan Catholic men leap into and swim in local wells, streams and ponds as a tribute to St. John the Baptist.

Background
The feast of São João is a celebration of the birthday of St. John the Baptist. St. John was the son of St. Elizabeth, a relative of Mary, the mother of Jesus. This feast is celebrated on 24 June. The significance of this date is that it falls three months after the feast of the Annunciation (25 March). At the Annunciation, the angel Gabriel told Mary that she would bear a son (Jesus), and that Elizabeth was already six months pregnant with a son. Mary visited Elizabeth, and when Elizabeth heard Mary's greeting, the baby St. John 'leapt' in her womb. The Annunciation itself occurs nine months before Christmas, the feast of Jesus' birth.

When John grew up, he is described as living in the wilderness, wearing clothes of camel's hair, eating locusts and wild honey. John foretold the coming of the Messiah, Jesus. When Jesus was thirty years old, he was baptised by St. John in the river Jordan.

The Nativity of John the Baptist is one of the oldest festivals of the Christian church, and there is record that it was already a big feast in the year 506 AD.

The feast of São João in Goa coincides with the time of the year when the monsoon usually has commenced, there are fresh greenery and flowers in the surroundings, and wells and other water bodies are full. Consequently, the celebration of the birth of St. John in Goa apparently evolved to incorporate elements of celebration of the rainy season. Jumping in wells and ponds is symbolic of the baby leaping in the womb, and of the baptism in the river Jordan. Men only wearing kopels made of flowers, and other adornments and vestments made from plants is probably also a nod to the fact that St. John wore natural coverings instead of clothing made of fabric.

Form of celebration 

While the feast of São João is celebrated across the Catholic world on the same day, Goa is the only place in the world where it is marked by leaping into wells. On this day, groups of people go around singing traditional songs accompanied with instruments like ghumot, mhadalem and kansallem.

"Tourists think it is only about jumping into wells. But the prayers we say before that are for a good monsoon," Cecil Pinto, described as the local authority on the feast of São João, has been quoted saying. The festival has been described as being "quite popular among tourists from both India and abroad".

Chari writes that while the São João celebrations are "centuries old", a more recent tradition is followed in the village of Siolim, in Bardez taluka, featuring colourful floats on boats. These festivities date back 175 years, when San Joao revellers from Chapora and Zhor villages of Anjuna, Badem in Assagao and Siolim would come in boats to the chapel of San Joao in Pereira Vaddo, Siolim, every year, to pay homage to the saint.

In the village of Saligao, also in the Bardez taluka, the event is celebrated as the Vangodd de Saligao, a village festival of music, dance and with the villagers often cooking enough food to feed all the visitors free of cost.

São João is also a celebration of thanksgiving for newly-weds, and for families with babies born during the preceding year.

References

External links 
 Sao Joao: A festival in Goa celebrated by jumping into wells and lakes; Sonali Pimputkar in FPJ
 Five things you didn't know about Sao Joao in Goa, Lyndon J Pinto

Saint John's Day
Culture of Goa
Festivals in Goa
Patronal festivals in India